Ahmadabad-e Olya may refer to:
 Ahmadabad-e Olya, East Azerbaijan
 Ahmadabad-e Olya, Hamadan
 Ahmadabad-e Olya, Kermanshah
 Ahmadabad-e Olya, West Azerbaijan

See also
 Ahmadabad-e Bala (disambiguation)